Ziro Festival of Music is an outdoor music festival held in the Ziro valley in the northeast Indian state of Arunachal Pradesh. It showcases the independent music scene in India. The festival was founded in 2012 by Bobby Hano and Menwhopause guitarist Anup Kutty, and has featured artists like Lee Ranaldo, Steve Shelley, Damo Suzuki, Shye Ben Tzur, MONO, Divine, Louw Majaw, Shaa'ir n Func, Indus Creed, Peter Cat Recording Co, Menwhopause, Guru Rewben Mashangva, and Barmer Boys among others. The festival is spread over four days and is hosted by members of the Apatani people in Ziro.

Festival grounds 
Ziro Festival is noted to be one of the most eco-friendly festivals in India employing locally sourced material for the infrastructure. The festival has two stages, Donyi(Sun) and Polo(Moon), constructed by local artisans and made almost completely of bamboo. This is inspired by the animist Donyi Polo faith prevalent in the tribes of Arunachal Pradesh. The festival has a zero plastic policy and encourages attendees to be responsible for leaving behind no waste.

Music 
The Ziro Festival of Music presents a wide spread of music genres, from the Indie folk brought by local North East Region of India to the foreign tunes from the international panels of the festival. (Deepa, 2019) Although the Ziro Festival of music can be categorised as a contemporary Musical festival with a large involvement of international guests, bands, artists and performers, ZFM includes a broad division of Indian Classical Music that represents the cultures and traditions of the Apatani Tribe. (Gupta)

The Journey 
The journey to the Ziro Festival of Music is an adventurous one. There are no direct flights to Ziro, Arunachal Pradesh. The closest airport is in North Lakhimpur assam, around 140 km, and second nearest airport now is Dibrugarh, Assam, around 300 km from Ziro Valley. There's an overnight train from Guwahati to Naharlagun, Arunachal Pradesh from where one can take a 3-hour cab ride to Ziro. One can also board an overnight train or bus to North Lakhimpur and opt for sumo at sharing basis or cab which will eventually lead to a 4.5hrs of travel to Ziro.

Formalities for Ziro Festival of Music 
Entry tickets to Ziro Festival of Music are available on the festival website. All non-Arunachali Indians need an Inner Line Permit and foreigners need a Protected Area Permit to enter Arunachal Pradesh. These are available at state tourist offices in all major Indian cities. You can also directly buy them there en route but, only if you reach early enough. There are also some government entry permits required to visit Ziro Valley. These permits can be obtained from state offices in Delhi, Guwahati and Tezpur. Be prepared for all such stuff.

References

Music festivals in India
Festivals in Arunachal Pradesh
Lower Subansiri district
Music festivals established in 2012
2012 establishments in Arunachal Pradesh
Ziro